Nationality words link to articles with information on the nation's poetry or literature (for instance, Irish or France).

Events
1386:
 Venetian ambassador Lorenzo de Monacis writes a poem defending Hungarian queens Mary and Elizabeth from charges of murdering Charles II of Hungary.

Works published
 Geoffrey Chaucer, Troilus and Criseyde exact year uncertain

Births
Death years link to the corresponding "[year] in poetry" article. There are conflicting or unreliable sources for the birth years of many people born in this period; where sources conflict, the poet is listed again and the conflict is noted:

1380:
 Laurent de Premierfait (died 1418), Latin poet, humanist and translator
 Azari Tusi (died 1462), Persian poet

1381:
 Krittibas Ojha (died 1461), Bengali poet
 Shōtetsu (died 1459), Japanese Waka poet

1387:
 Badr Shirvani (died 1450), Persian poet

1388:
 Nguyễn Trãi (died 1442), Vietnamese Confucian scholar, poet, politician and tactician

Deaths
Birth years link to the corresponding "[year] in poetry" article:

1385:
 Munenaga (born 1311), imperial prince and a poet of the Nijō poetic school of Nanboku-chō period

1388:
 Gidō Shūshin (born 1325), Japanese luminary of the Zen Rinzai sect, was a master of poetry and prose in Chinese

See also

 Poetry
 14th century in poetry
 14th century in literature
 List of years in poetry
 Grands Rhétoriqueurs
 French Renaissance literature
 Renaissance literature
 Spanish Renaissance literature

Other events:
 Other events of the 14th century
 Other events of the 15th century

15th century:
 15th century in poetry
 15th century in literature

Notes

14th-century poetry
Poetry